The United States census of 1970, conducted by the Census Bureau, determined the resident population of the United States to be 203,392,031, an increase of 13.4 percent over the 179,323,175 persons enumerated during the 1960 census. 

This was the first census since 1800 in which New York was not the most populous stateCalifornia overtook it in population in January 1963. This was also the first census in which all states recorded a population of over 300,000, and the first in which a city in the geographic SouthHoustonrecorded a population of over 1 million.

Data availability
Microdata from the 1970 census are freely available through the Integrated Public Use Microdata Series. Aggregate data for small areas, together with electronic boundary files, can be downloaded from the National Historical Geographic Information System. These data were originally created and disseminated by DUALabs. Personally identifiable information will be available in 2042.

State rankings

City rankings

Conclusions
California took over as the most populous state; New York had previously been ranked number one. While the entire country increased to more than 204 million persons, four states lost population, with West Virginia leading the list, down 8 and a half percent from 1960.

Notes

External links
 Historic US Census data
 1971 U.S Census Report, with estimated 1970 Census results
 1970 Census of Population

Census
United States census
United States